Chance Boatyard is a group of historic buildings at Annapolis, Anne Arundel County, Maryland.  It used to be a boat-building and repair complex. Most of the buildings were built between 1913 and 1942 to support the boat-building and repair activity of Chance Marine Construction Corporation and its successors, Annapolis Yacht Yards and Trumpy & Sons.

It was listed on the National Register of Historic Places in 1999.

References

External links

, including photo from 1997, at Maryland Historical Trust

Boatyards
Buildings and structures in Annapolis, Maryland
Industrial buildings and structures on the National Register of Historic Places in Maryland
Industrial buildings completed in 1913
1913 establishments in Maryland
National Register of Historic Places in Annapolis, Maryland